Amkhiriya is a village in Block Amariya, Tehsil and District Pilibhit in the Indian state of Uttar Pradesh. Amkhiriya have some British Government historical Building. These British Government Buildings served as guest houses for British army and other British employees during the pre-independence era.

Demographics 
Amkhiriya has a total population of about 2100. Hindi is the most spoken Language in the village.

Location 
Amkhiriya belongs to Bareilly division . It is located 15 km from District headquarters Pilibhit. and 280 km from State capital Lucknow.

Amkhiriya's nearest Villages:

Amkhera ( 1 km ), Dang ( 3 km ), Dhakiya ( 5 km ), Imamnagar ( 2 km ), Adoli ( 4 km ), Sirsi (3 km), Chaka (5 km ), Sahgawan Nagria(2 km) and Nisra (4 km) are the nearby Villages of Amkhiriya. Amkhiriya is surrounded by Lalaurikhera Tehsil towards South, Pilibhit Tehsil towards East, Damkhauda Tehsil towards west, Nawabganj Tehsil towards South .

How to reach Amkhiriya

By Rail

Shahi Rail Way Station and Laluri Khera Rail Way Station are the very nearby railway stations to Amkhiriya. However Bareilly Rail Way Station is major railway station 52 km near to Amkhiriya.

Education 
Schools & Colleges in Amkhiriya
 GM Inter College
Colleges near Amkhiriya
 K.j.s.h.s.s Uganpurmarauri Bisalpur
 Banke Bihari Ram Inter College
 Upadhi Mahavidyalaya
 Bismillah College

Villages in Pilibhit district